The 1961 Men's World Weightlifting Championships were held in Vienna, Austria from September 20 to September 25, 1961.  There were 120 men in action from 33 nations.

Medal summary

Medal table

References
Results (Sport 123)
Weightlifting World Championships Seniors Statistics

External links
International Weightlifting Federation

World Weightlifting Championships
World Weightlifting Championships
World Weightlifting Championships
International weightlifting competitions hosted by Austria
September 1961 sports events in Europe